This article shows all past squads from the Italian professional volleyball team Futura Volley Busto Arsizio from the Serie A League.

All Past Rosters

2016–17

2015–16

2014–15

2013–14

2012–13

2011–12

2010–11

2009–10

References

External links

 Official web site 

Italian women's volleyball club squads